Mário Delgado (born 15 December 1924) was a Portuguese equestrian. He competed in two events at the 1960 Summer Olympics.

References

External links
 

1924 births
Possibly living people
Portuguese male equestrians
Olympic equestrians of Portugal
Equestrians at the 1960 Summer Olympics
People from Amarante, Portugal
Sportspeople from Porto District